The 36th National Hockey League All-Star Game was held in Brendan Byrne Arena in East Rutherford, home to the New Jersey Devils, on January 31, 1984.

Uniforms 
The All-Star uniforms introduced in 1983 received an update for this game. The typeface for the diagonal "Wales" and "Campbell" conference names on the front of the jerseys changed from a plain block font to the style used by the New York Rangers. Trim stripes were added to the shoulder/sleeve panels and waistline - black on the white Wales jersey, and white on the orange Campbell jersey. This design would continue to be used through 1986.

Team lineups

Game summary 

Shots:
Campbell 13-15-10 (38)
Wales 13-11-6 (30)

See also
1983–84 NHL season

References

All
National Hockey League All-Star Games
1984 in sports in New Jersey
January 1984 sports events in the United States
Sports competitions in East Rutherford, New Jersey